The 2013–14 Auburn Tigers men's basketball team represented Auburn University during the 2013–14 college basketball season. The team's head coach was Tony Barbee, in his fourth and final season at Auburn. The team played their home games at the Auburn Arena in Auburn, Alabama as a member of the Southeastern Conference.

Before the season

Departures

Recruits

Season

Preseason
Head coach Tony Barbee announced the team's complete season schedule on August 30, 2013. The Tigers schedule to play three participants from the 2013 NCAA tournament, Northwestern State, Iowa State, and Illinois. The Tigers also scheduled to play host to ACC teams Clemson and Boston College. The SEC schedule was highlighted by the Tigers playing host to Florida, Kentucky, and Tennessee, while visiting LSU and Alabama.

The Tigers opened their season on October 28 with an exhibition game against NAIA opponent Victory. The fast-paced Tigers offense pulled out an easy victory, winning 109–67. Chris Denson led the Tigers with 21 points and highly touted freshman Tahj Shamsid-Deen scored 16 points in his first collegiate action. The Tigers finished off the preseason on November 1 by defeating Division II Paine College by a score of 99–64.

November
Auburn opened the regular season on November 8, hosting Nicholls State from the Southland Conference. KT Harrell, playing his first game as a Tiger after transferring from Virginia, led Auburn with 21 points to lead a 76–54 victory. The win snapped Auburn's ten game losing streak, dating back to the 2012–13 season. The Tigers welcomed their second straight Southland Conference opponent to Auburn Arena on November 15 as they hosted Northwestern State, a 2013 NCAA tournament participant. Auburn, led by Chris Denson's 29 points, jumped out to a nine-point halftime lead before the Demons exploded for 72 second-half points, leading to a 111–92 victory. Northwestern State, after going 0–17 in three point attempts in their season opener, shot 14–27 from beyond the arc.

Auburn closed out their five-game homestand by hosting three mid-major opponents in Jacksonville State, Murray State, and Tennessee State. The Gamecocks were the first to visit on November 19, falling to Auburn by a final score of 78–54. The Racers visited Auburn Arena on November 23 and fell to the Tigers by a score of 75–67 behind 23 points from Chris Denson. Lastly, Auburn faced the Tigers of Tennessee State, who entered the game winless at 0–6. Due to leading scorers KT Harrell and Chris Denson being in foul trouble, the Tigers struggled to pull away, but won thanks to the strength of freshman Tahj Shamsid-Deen, who had a career high 16 points in the 78–73 win.

December
The Tigers visited Hilton Coliseum in Ames, Iowa, on December 2 to take on the #17 Iowa State Cyclones as part of the Big 12/SEC Challenge. Despite 27 points from Denson, Auburn's cold-shooting from the field (35%) and a career game from Iowa State's Dustin Hogue (22 points, 16 rebounds), allowed the Cyclones to improve to 6–0 with a 99–70 win. Following the loss, Auburn traveled to Atlanta to take on Illinois on a neutral court. The Tigers once again struggled to shoot and were down 41–17 at halftime, but mounted a small comeback and lost by a final score of 81–62.

Roster

Schedule and results
Source: 

|-
!colspan=9 style="background:#172240; color:#FE3300;"| Exhibition

|-
!colspan=9 style="background:#172240; color:#FE3300;"| Non-conference games

|-
!colspan=9 style="background:#172240; color:#FE3300;"| Conference games

|-
!colspan=9 style="background:#172240; color:#FE3300;" | SEC Tournament

NOTES:
Game was originally scheduled for January 29, 2014, but was moved to January 30, 2014 (and broadcaster on ESPN3) due to snowy conditions across Alabama.

See also
2013–14 Auburn Tigers women's basketball team

References

Auburn Tigers men's basketball seasons
Auburn
Auburn
Auburn